Billboard Top R&B Records of 1953 is made up of two year-end charts compiled by Billboard magazine ranking the year's top rhythm and blues records based on record sales and juke box plays.

See also
Billboard No. 1 singles of 1953
Billboard year-end top 30 singles of 1953
1953 in music

References

1953 record charts
Billboard charts
1953 in American music